In Greek mythology, the Ionides (Ancient Greek: Ἰωνίδες) were a sisterhood of water nymphs. Their individual names were Calliphaea, Synallasis (or Synallaxis), Pegaea and Iasis.

It is also the name of a family from the island of Chios who settled in Britain in the early 19th century. Prominent members included the art collectors Constantine Alexander Ionides, son, and Alexander Constantine Ionides, father.

Mythology 
The Ionides dwelt at Elis, where they had a sanctuary near a spring flowing into River Cytherus, and were said to have the power to cure various diseases. Their surname was thought to have come from the name of Ion, son of Gargettus.

Note

Naiads

References 
 Pausanias, Description of Greece with an English Translation by W.H.S. Jones, Litt.D., and H.A. Ormerod, M.A., in 4 Volumes. Cambridge, MA, Harvard University Press; London, William Heinemann Ltd. 1918. . Online version at the Perseus Digital Library
 Pausanias, Graeciae Descriptio. 3 vols. Leipzig, Teubner. 1903.  Greek text available at the Perseus Digital Library.

Elean mythology
Women in mythology